Leptolalax laui is a species of frogs in the family Megophryidae.

Range
It has been recorded from Tai Mo Shan, Tai Po Kau, Shing Mun, Ho Chung, Kadoorie Farm and Botanic Garden, Sunset Peak, and Lantau Peak, in Hong Kong, as well as Wutongshan National Forest Park, Shenzhen City, Guangdong Province, China.

References

laui
Fauna of Hong Kong
Amphibians described in 2014